Indradyumna Swami is an ISKCON Guru and a sannyasi for the International Society for Krishna Consciousness (popularly known as ISKCON or the Hare Krishnas). He is a disciple of A. C. Bhaktivedanta Swami Prabhupada and is known for his traveling and preaching activities around the world, especially in Poland. Indradyumna Swami shares his experiences and realizations as a traveling monk in his journal The Diary of a Traveling Monk.

Biography 
Born as Brian Tibbitts on May 20, 1949, in Palo Alto, California. He eventually joined the US Marines to stop the spread of communism in Vietnam; but a year later he was discharged as a conscientious objector. In December 1971 he was initiated by A. C. Bhaktivedanta Swami Prabhupada, and given the name Indradyumna Dasa.

Indradyumna left the United States in 1972, journeying to Europe where he helped open new centers in France. In 1979, when he was 29, he took a vow of lifelong dedication to missionary activities as a celibate monk, entering the renounced order of sannyasa as Indradyumna Swami. In the early 1980s he served as the temple president at the New Mayapur château temple and farm near Châteauroux in France.

Among other international destinations in 2001 he headed up Food for Life's international relief effort to provide hot meals to 250,000 tsunami survivors in Sri Lanka.

Indradyumna Swami has been involved in coordinating the annual Festival of India tour in Poland since 1990. The festivals seek to introduce people to India's ancient cultural traditions through a feast of entertainment and education involving: classical Indian dance performances, theatre with larger-than-life puppets, presentations on Vedic texts such as Bhagavad-gita, musical performances, graphic exhibits, stalls with books and handicrafts, vegetarian food. The events are attended by between 5,000 and 10,000 people at a time.

Since 1996, Indradyumna Swami and the Polish Festival of India team have participated in the Przystanek Woodstock free music festival organized over the first weekend in August each year by Great Orchestra of Christmas Charity. Dubbed Europe's largest annual open-air event, Przystanek Woodstock is attended by over 600,000 people each year. Within the mayhem of this setting Indradyumna Swami and the Festival of India team of more than 500 volunteers set up a spiritual sanctuary called "Krishna's Village of Peace".

(Extract from Diary of A Traveling Preacher, Volume 6)

Bibliography

Indradyumna Swami Vraja Lila. — Torchlight Publishing, 1994. — 96 p.
Indradyumna Swami Daso 'Smi - I Am Your Servant. — 1994.
Indradyumna Swami Diary of a Traveling Preacher, Vol. I & II (May 1995 – November 1996). — Torchlight Publishing. — 296 p.
Indradyumna Swami Diary of a Traveling Preacher, Vol. III (January 2001 – September 2001). — Torchlight Publishing. — 251 p.
Indradyumna Swami Diary of a Traveling Preacher, Vol. IV (September 16, 2001 – April 19, 2003). — Torchlight Publishing. — 183 p.
Indradyumna Swami Diary of a Traveling Preacher, Vol. V (May 2003 – November 2004). — Torchlight Publishing. — 210 p.
Indradyumna Swami Diary of a Traveling Preacher, Vol. VI (November 2004 – December 2005). — Torchlight Publishing. — 221 p.
Indradyumna Swami Diary of a Traveling Preacher, Vol. VII (January 2006 – November 2006). — Torchlight Publishing. — 204 p.
Indradyumna Swami Diary of a Traveling Preacher, Vol. VIII (January 2007– January 2008). — Torchlight Publishing. — 158 p.
Indradyumna Swami Diary of a Traveling Preacher, Vol. IX (January 2008 – November 2008). — Torchlight Publishing. — 149 p.
Indradyumna Swami Diary of a Traveling Monk, Vol. X (November 2008 – October 2009). — Torchlight Publishing. — 152 p.
Indradyumna Swami Diary of a Traveling Monk, Vol. XI (November 2009 – March 2012). — Torchlight Publishing. — 161 p.

Footnotes

References

External links 
 Official directory of websites related to Indradyumna Swami
 Chapters of Indradyumna Swami's Diary of a Traveling Monk online
 Lectures and Kirtans by Indradyumna Swami
 Annual Indian Pilgrimage led by Indradyumna Swami
 Annual North American Kirtan Retreat organized by Indradyumna Swami
 Collection of diary blogs by Indradyumna Swami
 Collection of photos by Indradyumna Swami 
 Collection of verses quoted by Indradyumna Swami
 Archive & Radio by Indradyumna Swami 
 Tour and Pilgrimage led by Indradyumna Swami

International Society for Krishna Consciousness religious figures
Converts to Hinduism
Hindu revivalists
Living people
American Hare Krishnas
1949 births
People from Palo Alto, California
Performers of Hindu music